Tibbi Badra is a village in the Firozpur district of Punjab, India. It is located in the Zira tehsil.

Demographics 

According to the 2011 census of India, Tibbi Badra has 7 households. The effective literacy rate (i.e. the literacy rate of population excluding children aged 6 and below) is 75%.

References 

Villages in Zira tehsil